Sunset Gower Studios is a  television and movie studio at the corner of Sunset Boulevard and Gower Street in Hollywood, California. Established in 1912, it continues today as Hollywood's largest independent studio and an active facility for television and film production on its twelve soundstages.

History
The Poverty Row area of Hollywood, bounded by Sunset Boulevard on the North, Gower Street on the West, and Beachwood Drive on the East, was a collection of small warehouses and offices where independent film makers gathered to buy "short ends" of film from the major studios, in order to create their "great American dreams". In 1922, Harry Cohn of Cohn-Brandt-Cohn (CBC) Film Sales Corporation rented 6070 Sunset Blvd in Poverty Row. Following success and a move into feature films, in 1926, CBC (under its new name of Columbia Pictures), acquired a Gower Street property with stages previously used by California Studios. In 1928, Columbia's official address became 1438 Gower Street and that year they bought the last piece of land of the old Gower Ranch at 1400 N Gower Street.

The Sunset Gower Studios lot, the home of such Columbia classics as Frank Capra's It Happened One Night in 1934, Mr. Smith Goes to Washington in 1939, the Three Stooges shorts, Funny Girl and The Caine Mutiny, has continued to host productions of top new films such as The Good Shepherd and The Good German. Television programs which have occupied several sound stages most notably include current series Scandal and How to Get Away with Murder and ended series Heroes, Dexter, NewsRadio, The Amanda Show, Deal or No Deal, Saved by the Bell, Hip Hop Harry, City Guys, Six Feet Under, JAG, Married... with Children, Soap, That's So Raven, Moesha, The Parkers, The Donna Reed Show, Father Knows Best, Hazel, I Dream of Jeannie (which also used the "Father Knows Best" exterior house and "Donna Reed Show" interior living room), Bewitched, The Monkees, the first two seasons of The Golden Girls, the final three seasons of The Facts of Life, and the final two seasons of Silver Spoons.

Harry Cohn died in 1958 at the age of 66. His memorial service was held on stages 12 and 14 at the studios (there is no stage 13).

Without the guidance of the Cohn Brothers, Columbia Pictures Corporation was not the profit-making company it once was. Between 1970 and 1972, Columbia moved from the  lot, and joined forces with Warner Bros. in Burbank, then subsequently later moved to the Sony Pictures Studios (formally MGM and Lorimar Studio) in Culver City. Its "back lot" on Hollywood Way in Burbank, where the Columbia westerns were made, became the property of Warner Bros.

Columbia Pictures Corporation, renamed "Columbia Pictures Industries, Inc." after merging with its television subsidiary Screen Gems (now Sony Pictures Television) in 1968, became a film entity without real estate. A large list of successful films were produced during this time, and in 1982, Columbia Pictures Industries, Inc. was sold to The Coca-Cola Company for $750 million.

The lot, in the meantime, sat fallow. In 1977, the property was purchased by the Pick Vanoff Company for $6.2 million. The name was changed to "Sunset Gower Studios" and the lot became a rental facility for independent film companies. It was also used in the seventies as a music rehearsal facility catering to musicians such as Elton John, Fleetwood Mac, The Eagles, Led Zeppelin, Ringo Starr, Frank Zappa, and Olivia Newton-John. For a time stages 12 and 14 became indoor tennis courts.

In November 2004, Sunset Gower Studios was purchased by GI Partners for an estimated $105 million, and in 2006 began construction on a six-story building for Technicolor SA.

In August 2007, Sunset Gower Studios was bought by Hudson Capital. The Technicolor building opened its doors in 2008.  Since 2007, the studio has been undergoing both interior and exterior improvements on the lot.  Sunset Gower Studios is now working closely with its sister company Sunset Bronson Studios, located just a couple of blocks east on the site of the original Warner Bros. lot (1923–37), formerly owned by Tribune Broadcasting, and Sunset Las Palmas Studios, formerly the Hollywood Center Studios until 2017.

Expansion project 
In 2017, developer Hudson Pacific Properties submitted plans providing details of its new vision for Hollywood's landmark Sunset Gower Studios.

References

External links

Film studios in Southern California
Buildings and structures in Hollywood, Los Angeles
Film production companies of the United States
Television studios in the United States
Entertainment companies based in California
Culture of Hollywood, Los Angeles
Sunset Boulevard (Los Angeles)
Culture of Los Angeles
Companies based in Los Angeles
Mass media companies established in 1912
1912 establishments in California